The Rössler Prize, offered by the  ETH Zurich Foundation, is a monetary prize that has been awarded annually since 2009 to a promising young tenured professor of the ETH Zurich in the middle of an accelerating career. The prize of 200,000 Swiss Francs is financed by the returns from an endowment made by Max Rössler, an alumnus of the ETH. The prize money has to be used for the research of the laureate.

Laureates 
 2009: Nenad Ban, Microbiology
 2010: Gerald Haug, Geology of Climate
 2011: Andreas Wallraff, Solid State Physics
 2012: Nicola Spaldin, Material Science
 2013: Olivier Voinnet, RNA Biology
 2014: Christian Wolfrum, Health Sciences and Technology
 2015: David J. Norris, Mechanical and Process Engineering
 2016: Christophe Copéret, Chemistry and Applied Biosciences
 2017: Olga Sorkine-Hornung, Computer Science
 2018: Philippe Block, Architecture
 2019: Maksym Kovalenko, Inorganic chemistry/Nanotechnology
2020: Paola Picotti, Biology
 2021: Andreas Krause, Machine Learning
 2022: Tanja Stadler, Mathematics and Computational evolutionary biology

See also
 Science and technology in Switzerland
 Prizes named after people

Notes and references

External links
 Official website

Rössler Prize
Rössler Prize
Rössler Prize
Rössler Prize